Miloš Krstić (Serbian Cyrillic: Милош Крстић; born 19 November 1988 in Kragujevac) is a Serbian professional footballer who plays as a defender. He is currently a free agent.

Career
He made his first football steps in Voždovac, but have gained affirmation with Balkan Mirijevo. From season 2008/09 to 2010/11 the club had advanced from 5th to 3rd rank in Serbian football league system. Individually, Krstić had achieved even more by signing for Serbian SuperLiga side BSK Borča, thus became a player that had advanced through four ranks in only two years. In summer 2013 Krstić became player of Radnik Surdulica.

Personal life
Born in Kragujevac in central Serbia, but have never actually lived there, Krstić spent his infant years living in Priština, until NATO bombing of Yugoslavia in 1999. Apart from playing football, he had simultaneously attending education and got a diploma of a Faculty of Traffic and Transport Engineering at University of Belgrade.

Honours
Radnik Surdulica
Serbian First League: 2014–15

References

External sources
 
 Stats and bio (in Serbian) at Utakmica.rs
 Stats and profile at Srbijafudbal.net
 Profile at Prva liga Srbije page

1988 births
Living people
Sportspeople from Kragujevac
Serbian footballers
Serbian expatriate footballers
Serbian expatriate sportspeople in the Philippines
Expatriate footballers in the Philippines
FK BSK Borča players
OFK Mladenovac players
FK Radnik Surdulica players
FK Borac Čačak players
FK Kolubara players
Serbian First League players
Serbian SuperLiga players
Association football defenders
Serbian engineers
Davao Aguilas F.C. players
Al-Mujazzal Club players
Saudi First Division League players
Serbian expatriate sportspeople in Saudi Arabia
Expatriate footballers in Saudi Arabia